John David Lumsdon (born 20 July 1956) is an English former footballer who played at right-back for Stoke City, Port Vale, and Telford United in the 1970s.

Career
Lumsdon started his career with Stoke City, playing ten First Division games in the 1975–76 season. He made 13 appearances in the 1976–77 season as Tony Waddington's "Potters" suffered relegation. He played five Second Division games in the 1977–78 season. He was loaned to Potteries derby rivals Port Vale in March 1978, and played five Third Division games for Bobby Smith's "Valiants" before returning to Victoria Ground at the end of the season. As of March 2017, he is the last player to have joined Port Vale on loan from Stoke City. He later moved on to Southern League side Telford United.

Career statistics
Source:

References

Footballers from Newcastle upon Tyne
English footballers
Association football fullbacks
Stoke City F.C. players
Port Vale F.C. players
Telford United F.C. players
English Football League players
Southern Football League players
1956 births
Living people